This is a list of fighter aces in World War II of the Royal Romanian Air Force. For other countries see List of World War II aces by country.

Romanian WW2 victory system
In February 1944, the ARR implemented a new and unique scoring system for victories. Victory points were awarded for confirmed and unconfirmed victories as well as for aircraft destroyed on the ground. Points were also awarded for shared victories. This system was applied to all claims prior to its introduction date and followed these rules:
 3 victories for a 4 or 6 engine aircraft
 2 victories for a 2 or 3 engine aircraft
 1 victory for a single engine aircraft

List of aces
The following list contains all pilots who scored 5 victories by the 1944 standard, also mentioning their number of aircraft shot down including shares and unconfirmed victories:

* Shared victory

Notes

References

Bibliography
 

Romania
World War II flying aces